Başak Konutları is an underground rapid transit station on the M3 line of the Istanbul Metro. It is located in central Başakşehir at the junction of Atatürk and Hürriyet Boulevards. The station was opened on 14 June 2013 and has an island platform serviced by two tracks.

Layout

References

Railway stations opened in 2013
Istanbul metro stations
Başakşehir
2013 establishments in Turkey